NACHT, LRR and PYD domains-containing protein 7 is a protein that in humans is encoded by the NLRP7 gene.

Function 

NALPs are cytoplasmic proteins that form a subfamily within the larger CATERPILLER protein family. Most short NALPs, such as NALP7, have an N-terminal pyrin (MEFV) domain (PYD), followed by a NACHT domain, a NACHT-associated domain (NAD), and a C-terminal leucine-rich repeat (LRR) region. NALPs are implicated in the activation of proinflammatory caspases (e.g., CASP1) via their involvement in multiprotein complexes called inflammasomes.

References

Further reading

 

LRR proteins
NOD-like receptors